Parole der Woche ("Slogan of the Week" or "Word of the Week") was a wall newspaper published by the  (propaganda department of the Nazi Party)  from 1937 to 1943. Historian Jeffrey Herf describes Parole der Woche as "the most ubiquitous and intrusive aspect of Nazism’s visual offensive ... no form of Nazi visual propaganda made so crucial a contribution to the regime’s presentation of ongoing events".

Establishment

Herf suggests that the Nazi artist Hans Schweitzer was influential in the establishment of Parole der Woche, which began to publish in October 1937. An article in Unser Wille und Weg, the internal newsletter of the RPL, stated in June 1936:

On 23 September 1939, shortly after the outbreak of World War II, Nazi propaganda minister Joseph Goebbels emphasized the importance of posters to Nazi propaganda efforts, "above all" Parole der Woche.

Themes and influence

Parole der Woche combined multiple styles including those of editorials, leaflets, posters, and tabloid journalism. Although antisemitism was marginal in Parole der Woche until 1940, it later became a major theme, with one-third of the posters from 1941 to 1943 expressing antisemitism. Six issues dealt with Germany Must Perish! and the supposed Jewish-Allied intention to exterminate the German population. The posters repeatedly accused Jews of starting the war and intending to exterminate Germans. On the day before the German declaration of war against the United States, Parole der Woche published an issue with a chart showing the supposed international Jewish conspiracy which connected Roosevelt, Churchill, and Stalin. Herf argues that to Germans who had no other sources of information, "The image and text of the wall newspaper
offered a seemingly compelling explanation of how the Jews, so few in number, could have been so successful in plotting against Germany." In this poster and others, antisemitism was combined with anti-Americanism, Anglophobia, and the conspiracy theory of Jewish Bolshevism.

They were designed to be read by multiple people simultaneously from a distance of a few feet and used colors and graphics to attract, even compel, attention. Along with the posters, the Nazi Party also published miniature versions the size of playing cards, which were often attached to official communications. Around 125,000 poster-size copies were printed of each issue and posted in "every imaginable public place", such that, according to Herf, people in Germany "could not avoid" seeing it. In Spring/Summer 1940, the Nazi Party reported that there were 63,121 orders for the poster: 34,635 from the German Labor Front, 10,940 from doctors' organizations, and 5,960 from the owners of bars, restaurants, and similar businesses.

On May 5, 1943, the Reich Propaganda Directorate in Berlin informed regional propaganda offices that it was ending the Word of the Week due to the demands of war putting pressure on budgets and the calling up of more party members for active duty.

The posters were noted for their heavy use of exclamation marks, a hallmark of NS-Deutsch—the form of the German language used by the Nazi regime.

Spoof

From 1942 to 1945, small-sized spoof versions were produced as black propaganda by the Political Warfare Executive and dropped by Allied aircraft over Germany. On 11 March 1943, Allied aircraft distributed a leaflet about German victory:  Propaganda Warfare Executive manager Sefton Delmer wrote that this leaflet was a deliberate parody of a similar genuine Parole der Woche leaflet which spoke of actual German victories. In late 1943, one of these leaflets contained a quote misattributed to Hitler: "If the German people should collapse beneath its present burden, I would shed no tears for it—it would deserve its fate..." In 1944, one leaflet stated "We want a leader by the grace of God and not a murderer from Berchtesgaden!" This slogan became especially popular with anti-Nazi Germans and those who considered the war hopeless.

References

Sources

External links

 Many issues for view at United States Holocaust Memorial Museum website
 Issues at Randall Bytwerk's website

Nazi newspapers
1936 establishments in Germany
1945 disestablishments in Germany